Jess Hall, ASC, BSC (born 16 March 1971) is a British cinematographer. His parents were Stuart Hall, the Jamaican-born Cultural Studies pioneer and former professor at the Open University, and Catherine Hall, Professor and leading historian at University College, London.

Life and career 
Hall's first job as cinematographer took place on production of the film Stander, starring Thomas Jane. He acted as director of photography on several British productions, including the Edgar Wright crime comedy Hot Fuzz, the comedy Son of Rambow and the war drama Brideshead Revisited, his work on which earned him a Satellite Award nomination. Hall began working on American productions starting with the 2010 comedy The Switch and followed by 30 Minutes or Less, The Spectacular Now and Transcendence.

He was the cinematographer for the Scarlett Johansson-starring adaptation of the Japanese anime Ghost in the Shell. He has stated that he sought out a digital camera that could replicate the style anime is shown in.

Hall studied at New York University as well as St Martins College of Art & Design.

Filmography 
Film

Television

References

External links 
 
 Official website

1971 births
British cinematographers
Place of birth missing (living people)
Living people